The Buffelsfontein mine is one of the largest gold mines in the South Africa and in the world. The mine is located in the center of the country in the Free State. The mine has estimated reserves of 11.02 million oz of gold.

References 

Gold mines in South Africa
Economy of North West (South African province)